Radio México Internacional is a Mexican government-run radio service based in Mexico City.  It broadcast as a shortwave radio station with the broadcast callsign XERMX-OC from 1969 to 2004, and was relaunched as an Internet-only radio service in 2011.  Since 1983 it has been under the control of the Instituto Mexicano de la Radio (IMER).  The -OC suffix is from onda corta, Spanish for "short wave".

History

Early federal stations
Federal shortwave broadcasting in Mexico goes back to at least 1934, when the
Secretariat of Foreign Affairs (SRE) started XECR.  It was discontinued in 1937 when the government of Lázaro Cárdenas began shortwave station XEXA through the Autonomous Department of Press and Publicity (DAPP).  XEXA continued into the 1940s.

XERMX
In 1968, Luis Echeverría, then Secretary of the Interior, ordered Notimex to create a new shortwave station.  The Secretariat of Communications and Transportation (SCT) allocated a set of five frequencies to be used at various times of the day: 5.985 MHz on the 49-meter band; 9.705 MHz on 31 meters; 11.77 MHz on 25 meters; 15.43 MHz on 19 meters; and 17.765 MHz on 16 meters.

XERMX-OC began broadcasting on 1 September 1969. It had 10,000-watt transmitters.

In a November 2006 interview, IMER director Dolores Beistegui responded when asked why XERMX was taken off the air:

Internet audio
Radio México Internacional was relaunched by IMER as an Internet radio service on 1 January 2011, to provide programming in Spanish, English, French, and indigenous languages, with music, dramas, documentaries, and other types of programs.

It is aired as an HD Radio subchannel of XHOF-FM (105.7 HD2) in the Mexico City area and on two FM stations owned by the SPR, XHSPRM-FM 103.5 Mazatlán and XHSPRT-FM 101.1 Tapachula.

References

External links 
 Radio México Internacional — official webpage

Radio stations established in 1969
Radio stations in Mexico City
International broadcasters
Internet radio stations
Shortwave radio stations
1969 establishments in Mexico